The men's high jump at the 1971 European Athletics Championships was held in Helsinki, Finland, at Helsinki Olympic Stadium on 13 and 14 August 1971.

Medalists

Results

Final
14 August

Qualification
13 August

Participation
According to an unofficial count, 27 athletes from 13 countries participated in the event.

 (3)
 (1)
 (2)
 (3)
 (3)
 (2)
 (1)
 (1)
 (3)
 (3)
 (1)
 (3)
 (1)

References

High jump
High jump at the European Athletics Championships